This is a list of Norwegian television related events from 1961.

Events
18 February - Nora Brockstedt is selected to represent Norway at the 1961 Eurovision Song Contest with her song "Sommer i Palma". She is selected to be the second Norwegian Eurovision entry during Melodi Grand Prix held at NRK Studios in Oslo.

Debuts

Television shows

Ending this year

Births
18 March - Ingvild Bryn, news anchor

Deaths